This is a list of notable events in country music that took place in 1969.

Events
 January 4 – Dolly Parton becomes a member of The Grand Ole Opry.
 January 29 – The Glen Campbell Goodtime Hour premieres on CBS, for what will be a three-year run.
 February 16 – George Jones and Tammy Wynette marry in Ringgold, Georgia, after telling others that their marriage was in August 1968. They quickly earn the titles such as "The First Couple of Country Music", "Country's Sweethearts" and "The President and First Lady".
 February 24 – Johnny Cash records his second live album behind prison walls in as many years at San Quentin State Prison. The resulting album is At San Quentin, and contains his hit "A Boy Named Sue." The concert is also taped for television broadcast.
 June 7 – The Johnny Cash Show premieres on ABC; the series will run through 1971.
 June 15 – The summer replacement series Hee Haw airs for the first time on CBS. The first guests to Kornfield Kounty – for what will be a 23-year run, the bulk of which will be in syndication – are Charley Pride and Loretta Lynn.
 October – The Country Music Association airs its awards program live for the first time (the previous year's ceremony was taped, with the show airing a few weeks later). The annual awards show — at the time airing in October on NBC – quickly becomes one of country music's most eagerly anticipated events of the year.

No dates
Tammy Wynette, who during the year becomes a member of the Grand Ole Opry, becomes the first female country artist to sell over one million copies of a single recording with her Tammy's Greatest Hits collection.

Top hits of the year

Number-one hits

United States
(as certified by Billboard)

Notes
1^ No. 1 song of the year, as determined by Billboard.
A^ First Billboard No. 1 hit for that artist.
B^ Last Billboard No. 1 hit for that artist.

Canada
(as certified by RPM)

Notes
2^ Song dropped from No. 1 and later returned to top spot.
A^ First RPM No. 1 hit for that artist.
B^ Last RPM No. 1 hit for that artist.
C^ Only RPM No. 1 hit for that artist.

Other major hits

Singles released by American artists

Singles released by Canadian artists

Top new album releases

Births
 January 3 – Nikki Nelson, female lead vocalist of the band Highway 101 (on and off since the early 1990s).
 March 28 – Rodney Atkins, singer-songwriter since the mid to late 2000s (decade).
 March 29 – Brady Seals, singer, keyboardist and member of Little Texas from 1988 to 1994.
 April 20 – Wade Hayes, honky tonk-styled singer of the mid-to-late 1990s.
 August 19 – Clay Walker, neotraditionalist who began enjoying hits in the mid-1990s.
 September 28 – Karen Fairchild, member of Little Big Town.
 October 12 – Martie Maguire, member of the Dixie Chicks (she plays the fiddle, mandolin and viola).
 October 13 – Rhett Akins, singer who enjoyed most of his success in the mid-1990s, and later became a prolific songwriter; father of Thomas Rhett.
 October 15 – Kimberly Schlapman, member of Little Big Town.

Deaths
 September 11 – Leon Payne, 52, singer and prolific songwriter ("I Love You Because," "You've Still Got a Place in My Heart" and many others).
 November 23 – Spade Cooley, 59, singer/songwriter/fiddler of the 1940s; best known for "Detour" and "Shame on You." (heart attack)

Country Music Hall of Fame Inductees
Gene Autry (1907–1998)
Bill Monroe (1911–1996)

Major awards

Grammy Awards
Best Female Country Vocal Performance — "Stand by Your Man", Tammy Wynette
Best Male Country Vocal Performance — "A Boy Named Sue", Johnny Cash
Best Country Performance by a Duo or Group with Vocal — "MacArthur Park", Waylon Jennings and The Kimberleys
Best Country Instrumental Performance — The Nashville Brass featuring Danny Davis Play More Nashville Sounds, Danny Davis and the Nashville Brass
Best Country Song — "A Boy Named Sue", Shel Silverstein (Performer: Johnny Cash)

Academy of Country Music
Single of the Year — "Okie from Muskogee", Merle Haggard
Album of the Year — Okie from Muskogee, Merle Haggard
Top Male Vocalist — Merle Haggard
Top Female Vocalist — Tammy Wynette
Top Vocal Duo — Merle Haggard and Bonnie Owens
Top Vocal Group — The Kimberleys
Top New Male Vocalist — Freddy Weller
Top New Female Vocalist — Donna Fargo

Country Music Association
Entertainer of the Year — Johnny Cash
Song of the Year — "The Carroll County Accident", Bob Ferguson (Performer: Porter Wagoner)
Single of the Year — "A Boy Named Sue", Johnny Cash
Album of the Year — At San Quentin, Johnny Cash
Male Vocalist of the Year — Johnny Cash
Female Vocalist of the Year — Tammy Wynette
Vocal Group of the Year — Johnny Cash and June Carter
Instrumentalist of the Year — Chet Atkins
Instrumental Group of the Year — Danny Davis and the Nashville Brass
Comedian of the Year — Archie Campbell

Further reading
Kingsbury, Paul, "The Grand Ole Opry: History of Country Music. 70 Years of the Songs, the Stars and the Stories," Villard Books, Random House; Opryland USA, 1995
Kingsbury, Paul, "Vinyl Hayride: Country Music Album Covers 1947–1989," Country Music Foundation, 2003
Millard, Bob, "Country Music: 70 Years of America's Favorite Music," HarperCollins, New York, 1993
Whitburn, Joel, "Top Country Songs 1944–2005 – 6th Edition." 2005.

Other links
Country Music Association
Inductees of the Country Music Hall of Fame

External links
Country Music Hall of Fame

Country
Country music by year